Ralph Burns Kellogg (August 2, 1946 – June 19, 2003), also known as Ethan James, was a musician, record producer, and recording engineer best known for his work on Minutemen's seminal album Double Nickels on the Dime. He also produced and engineered albums for Black Flag, The Bangles, Rain Parade, Dos, Psychobud and many others. Many of these recordings were undertaken at Radio Tokyo Studio, the recording facility he founded in the early 1980s.

Under his real name, he was a member of the heavy metal band Blue Cheer from 1969 to 1972.  He was considered a master of the hurdy-gurdy, a medieval instrument, and was also noted for playing the symphonium.  James returned to performing in 1989 and performed with the San Francisco Mozart Festival Orchestra, among others.

James died of complications from liver cancer in San Francisco at the age of 56.

Selected discography 
 Shaking Hands With Kafka (Moll Tonträger, 1993)
 What Rough Beast (Moll Tonträger, 1995)
 The Ancient Music Of Christmas (Hannibal Records, 1996)
 A Garden Of Hurdy-Gurdy Delights (Taqsim Records, 1997)
 Learning Chinese The Hard Way (Stonegarden Records, 2002)

References 

1946 births
2003 deaths
American heavy metal musicians
Deaths from liver cancer
American audio engineers
Deaths from cancer in California
Blue Cheer members
20th-century American musicians
20th-century American engineers